Monochirus is a genus of small soles. It contains two species; one from the northeast Atlantic and Mediterranean, and the second from the South China Sea.

Species
There are currently two recognized species in this genus:
 Monochirus hispidus Rafinesque, 1814 (Whiskered sole)
 Monochirus trichodactylus (Linnaeus, 1758)

References

Soleidae
Marine fish genera
Taxa named by Constantine Samuel Rafinesque